This is a list of Jeeves and Wooster characters from the TV series, based on the Jeeves books by P. G. Wodehouse.

Main characters

Jeeves and Bertie Wooster are in all the episodes.

Actors
Actors' names are given with the series in which they appeared.
 Bertie Wooster — Hugh Laurie
 Jeeves — Stephen Fry

Recurring characters

Minor characters
 
Character — Actor (Series)
 
 Anatole — John Barrard (2)
 Rosie M. Banks — Anastasia Hille (4)
 Cyril Bassington-Bassington — Nicholas Hewetson (3)
 Cora Bellinger — Constance Novis (1)
 Francis Bickersteth ("Bicky") — Julian Firth (3)
 Edgar Gascoyne Bickersteth, father of "Bicky" — John Savident (3)
 Charles Edward Biffen ("Biffy") — Philip Shelley (2)
 Mabel, fiancée of "Biffy" — Jenny Whiffen (2)
 Rev. Beefy Bingham — Owen Brenman (1)
 Mortimer Little, Lord Bittlesham — Geoffrey Toone (2,3,4)
 Mr. Blumenfield — Billy J. Mitchell (1,3)
 Sydney Blumenfield — Anatol Yusef (1,3)
 Daphne Braithwaite — Justine Glenton (1)
 Brinkley — Fred Evans (2,4)
 George Caffyn — David Crean (3); Nigel Whitmey (4)
 Freddie Chalk-Marshall — John Duval (1)
 "Chuffy" Chuffnell — Matthew Solon (2)
 Seabury Chuffnell — Edward Holmes (2)
 Myrtle Chuffnell — Fidelis Morgan (2)
 Chichester Clam — John Cater (4)
 Professor Vladimir Cluj — Michael Poole (1)
 Aneta Cluj — Zulema Dene (1)
 Bruce Corcoran ("Corky") — Greg Charles (3)
 Blair Eggleston — Otto Jarman (4)
 Boko Fittleworth — Richard Stirling (1)
 Freddie Flowerdew — John Boulter (3)
 Cyril "Barmy" Fotheringay-Phipps — Adam Blackwood (1); Martin Clunes (2)
 Oswald Glossop — Alistair Haley (1)
 Aline Hemmingway — Rebecca Saire (2)
 Sidney Hemmingway — Graham Seed (2)
 Zenobia "Nobby" Hopwood — Jennifer Gibson (4)
 Porkie Jupp — Paul Kynman (4)
 Constable Eustace Oates — Campbell Morrison (2), Stewart Harwood (3), Sydney Livingstone (4)
 Gwladys Pendlebury — Deirdre Strath (4)
 Lucius Pim — Marcus D'Amico (4)
 Catsmeat Potter-Pirbright — John Elmes (3)
 Lady Malvern — Moyra Fraser (3)
 Wilmot Pershore ("Motty") — Ronan Vibert (3)
 Oofy Prosser — Richard Dixon (1,2,4)
 Arthur Prysock — John Cassady (3)
 Lord Rainsby — Jason Calder (1)
 Enoch Simpson — David Blake Kelly (1)
 Alexander Worple — Bill Bailey (3)
 Muriel Singer (later Mrs. Alexander Worple) — Dena Davis (3)
 Slingsby — Harry Ditson (4)
 Myrtle Snap — Veronica Clifford (4)
 Rupert Steggles — Richard Braine (1)
 Dwight Stoker — James Holland (actor) (2)
 Pauline Stoker — Sharon Holm (2); Kim Huffman (3)
 Emerald Stoker — Emma Hewitt (4)
 J. Washburn Stoker — Manning Redwood (2); Don Fellows (3)
 Todd Rockmeteller ("Rocky") — John Fitzgerald-Jay (3)
 Isabel Rockmetteller, aunt of "Rocky" — Heather Canning (3) 
 Angela Travers — Amanda Elwes (1)
 Tom Travers — Ralph Michael (1,4)
 Jas Waterbury — David Healy (4)
 Trixie Waterbury — Serretta Wilson (4)
 Roberta Wickham ("Bobbie") — Nina Botting (1); Niamh Cusack (2)
 Lady Wickham — Rosemary Martin (1)
 Sir Cuthbert Wickham — Brian Haines (1)
 Lord Wickhammersley — Jack Watling (1)
 Lady Wickhammersley — Richenda Carey (1)
 Freddie Widgeon — Charles Millham (1); John Duval (2)
 Maud Wilberforce — Paula Jacobs (1)
 Dame Daphne Winkworth — Rosalind Knight (3)
 Gertrude Winkworth — Chloë Annett (3)
 Ginger Winship — Jullian Gartside (4)
 Uncle George Wooster, Lord Yaxley — Nicholas Selby (1)
 Claude Wooster  — Hugo E. Blick (1); Jeremy Brook (4)
 Eustace Wooster — Ian Jeffs (1); Joss Brook (4)
 Edwin Craye — Kristopher Milnes (4)
 Percy Craye, Lord Worplesdon — Frederick Treves (4)

See also
 List of Jeeves and Wooster episodes
 List of Jeeves characters
 The Jeeves books

Lists of British sitcom television characters
.